Aybol Yerbolatuly Abiken (Aibol Erbolatūly Äbıken; born 1 June 1996) is a Kazakhstani footballer who plays as a defender and is currently banned after testing positive Meldonium.

Career

Club
Abiken made his professional debut for FC Kairat in the Kazakhstan Premier League on 29 April 2017, coming on as a substitute in the 87th minute for Bauyrzhan Islamkhan in the match against FC Akzhayik, which finished as a 4–1 home win.

On 25 November 2019, Abiken signed a new three-year contract with FC Kairat.

On 27 February 2022, Abiken signed for Aksu on loan for the 2022 season.

In June 2022, Abiken was banned for three-years after being found to have taken Meldonium.

In January 2023, it became known that the player's suspension was reduced from 4 to 2 years. He is expected to enter the field in 2024.

International
Abiken made his Kazakhstan national football team debut on 9 September 2019 in a Euro 2020 qualifier against Russia. He started the game and played the whole match.

Career statistics

Club

International

Statistics accurate as of match played 15 November 2020

International goals 
Scores and results list Kazakhstan's goal tally first.

References

External links
 
 
 
 
 

1996 births
Living people
Kazakhstani footballers
Kazakhstan under-21 international footballers
Kazakhstan international footballers
Association football defenders
FC Kairat players
Kazakhstan Premier League players